Calathus depressus is a species of ground beetle from the Platyninae subfamily that is endemic to the Canary Islands.

References

depressus
Beetles described in 1836
Endemic beetles of the Canary Islands
Taxa named by Gaspard Auguste Brullé